Samyn may refer to:

Auriea Harvey & Michael Samyn, two artists who collaborate on creating art video games
Ellen Samyn (born 1980), Belgian-Flemish politician and MP
Emile Samyn (born 1997), Belgian footballer
Jean-Luc Samyn (born 1956), jockey in American Thoroughbred horse racing
José Samyn (1946–1969), French professional road bicycle racer who died during a race in Zingem, Belgium
Julien Samyn (1890–1968), Belgian racing cyclist
Philippe Samyn (born 1948), Belgian architect and civil engineer

See also
Le Samyn, annual single-day road bicycle race in Belgium, held usually in late February or early March
Saman (disambiguation)
Samian (disambiguation)
Samin (disambiguation)
Syman